Meg! (with the exclamation mark) is a comic strip by Greg Curfman and distributed by United Feature Syndicate.  The main characters are Meg, an elementary-age soccer player, her little brother Mike (victim of Meg's pranks), their parents, and Meg's friend Ashley. Curfman based much on the series on himself and his family.

Publication history 
Meg! entered syndication through United Features on March 3, 1997, running until June 24, 2001. It then was in reruns on GoComics until August 16, 2020.

References

External links
 
 About.com About Meg!
 Archived official Meg! site

Female characters in comics
Child characters in comics
Association football comics
Gag-a-day comics
1997 comics debuts
2004 comics endings
Comics characters introduced in 1997